Pinery Station, or The Pinery, was built as a relay station on the Butterfield Overland Mail stagecoach route, located at the crest of Guadalupe Pass in what is now Guadalupe Mountains National Park in the U.S. state of Texas. The station, now in ruins, was built in 1858 and was abandoned the next year. It is located close by U.S. Routes 62/160 and is accessible for tourists.

The station location had been a camp for military expeditions since 1849. The station was built as a fortification with stone walls protecting a corral and a second enclosure for the three-room station house. The station was located near Pine Spring and featured good grazing land nearby. The station offered fresh teams of horses and hot meals for stage crews and passengers. In 1859 the trail route was changed to pass close to Fort Davis and Fort Stockton. Even after its abandonment it was used by passers-by on the old trail.

The Pinery was placed on the National Register of Historic Places (NRHP) on October 9, 1974 and became a contributing property within the Butterfield Overland Mail Corridor NRHP historic district on August 27, 2014.

See also

 National Register of Historic Places listings in Culberson County, Texas

References

External links

 The Pinery at Guadalupe Mountains National Park
 National Register of Historic Places Inventory — Nomination Form: Butterfield Overland Mail Corridor from Texas Historical Commission

Transportation buildings and structures on the National Register of Historic Places in Texas
Buildings and structures in Culberson County, Texas
National Register of Historic Places in Guadalupe Mountains National Park
Butterfield Overland Mail in Texas
Ruins in the United States
National Register of Historic Places in Culberson County, Texas
Stagecoach stations on the National Register of Historic Places
Stagecoach stations in Texas
Historic districts on the National Register of Historic Places in Texas